Southern Compromise may refer to the following pieces of American legislation:

Compromise of 1850, package of five bills regarding slavery in new territories, designed to avoid secession or civil war
Southern Compromise Amendment of 1867, legislation about Black Southerners' civil rights in the Reconstruction Era of the United States
Compromise of 1877, about inaugurating Rutherford B. Hayes in exchange for recognizing Southern Democratic governors

Political compromises in the United States